Ewbanks is an unincorporated community in Ellington Township, Adams County, Illinois, United States. Ewbanks is located along a railroad line northeast of Quincy.

It was previously known as "Eubanks". A post office called Eubanks was established in 1872, and remained in operation until 1895.

References

Unincorporated communities in Adams County, Illinois
Unincorporated communities in Illinois